Copelatus zadiensis is a species of diving beetle. It is part of the subfamily Copelatinae in the family Dytiscidae. It was described by Bilardo & Rocchi in 1995.

References 

zadiensis
Beetles described in 1995